Pirma is a Mexican sports equipment manufacturing company. It began in 1990 in Mexico and expanded in the Americas. The company commercialises men's and women's urban clothing and apparel (including jackets, t-shirts, and shorts), sports uniforms, athletic shoes, goalkeeper gloves, and footballs.

Company's products include a variety of sports such as football, basketball, boxing, running, and tennis. It also sells accessories such as bags, caps, and goalkeeper gloves.

Pirma has about 200 stores in Mexico, supplied by its two plants in León and San Francisco del Rincón both in the state of Guanajuato, with nearly 3,000 employees. Apart from Mexico, the firm operates in Brazil, Canada, Costa Rica, El Salvador, Panama, and the United States, exporting 10% of its products to those countries.

History 
The origins of the company can be traced back to 1987 when entrepreneur Rafael León started to produce shoe soles in San Francisco del Rincón (Guanajuato) through its own company, "Caribbean". Three years later it entered into production of athletic footwear. The company was known as "Pirma-Brasil" until 1999 when the word Brasil was suppressed due to registration of brands including countries names was not allowed.

By 2013, Pirma concentrated 8% of sporting goods production in Mexico, positioning it as the 6th company in this sector.

In 2018, Pirma signed a deal with Mexican multimedia company Grupo Televisa to provide clothing for all its staff during the 2018 FIFA World Cup held in Russia. The company supplied about 200 workers (including cameramen, photographers and hosts) of the "Televisa Deportes" division that travelled to Russia to cover the competition.

Sponsorships

Boxing

Boxers
  Jorge Arce 
  Juan Manuel Marquéz
  Julio César Chávez Jr.
  Diego Mau
  Angel Figueroa

Football

Club teams

  Luziânia
  Santa Maria
  Brasilia
  Bosque Formosa
  Everton
  Club Sport Herediano
  Coatepeque
  Juticalpa FC
  Real Sociedad
  Necaxa
  León
  Morelia
  Loros
  Ocelotes
  Zacatecas
  Coyotes de Tlaxcala
  Loros De Colima

Players

  Andres Rios  
  Damian Alvarez 
  Daniel Ludueña 
  Mauro Formica  
  Rico
  Peter Byers 
  Lucas Silva
  Wilson Tiago  
  David Testo  
  Joe Di Buono
  Simon Gatti  
  Stephen deRoux  
  Jorge Kalu Gastelum
  Flavio Santos 
  Vicente Matias Vuoso 
  Edwin Hernández 
  Ignacio González
  Martín Bravo 
  Christian Valdez 
  Adrian Cortes 
  Severo Meza  
  Maribel Domínguez 
  Carlos Esquivel  
  Jorge Iván Estrada  
  Fernando Espinosa  
  Juan Carlos Medina 
  Rodolfo Salinas  
  Joel Huiqui 
  Gil Burón  
  Carlos Felipe Rodriguez 
  Miguel Sabah   
  Leobardo Lopez  
  Mauricio Castañeda  
  Osmar Mares 
  Carlos Ochoa  
  Luis Esqueda
  Mario de Luna  
  Alexandro Alvarez 
  Fausto Pinto 
  Oscar Fernandez
  Oscar Vera

References

External links 
 

Clothing companies established in 1990
Sporting goods manufacturers of Mexico
Sportswear brands
Mexican brands